Banglalion Communications Ltd was a privately held Bangladeshi 4G wireless broadband operator. It used WiMAX technology. It had a nationwide licence from the Bangladesh Telecommunication Regulatory Commission (BTRC) to provide broadband wireless access services for data, voice and video. Banglalion covered 7 divisional headquarters and 30 major districts of Bangladesh. As of 2022, it does not provide any products.

History
Banglalion, chaired by Major (Retd.) Abdul Mannan, won a WiMAX licence in an auction held by the Bangladesh Telecommunication Regulatory Commission (BTRC) in September 2008. It was the highest bidder, at Tk 2.15 billion ($31.4M as of September 2008), and chose spectrum in the 2585-2620 MHz bandwidth. In November 2009, it became the second operator, after Augere, to launch a WiMAX network in Bangladesh.

As of 2022, it does not provide any products.

Services

Banglalion used to offer both postpaid and prepaid packages for its users. These packages came in different bandwidth and speed limits. Banglalion's competitors were Qubee and Ollo.

Coverage

Banglalion used to cover 7 divisional cities Dhaka, Gazipur, Chittagong, Sylhet, Rajshahi, Khulna, Rangpur and Barisal. Network had rolled out in other major cities such as Munshiganj, Naraynganj, Rajbari, Mymensingh, Comilla, Noakhali, Laxmipur, Satkhira, Bogra, and Cox's Bazar.

Banglalion officially shut down 
In 2021, Banglalion's license was revoked and was officially shut down. In December 2020, BTRC owed Banglalion about BDT 205.94 crore. They cannot afford to repay this loan. As a result, despite the license being valid until 2023, Banglalion's license was revoked.

References

Further reading
 
 
 
 
 
 
 

Internet service providers of Bangladesh